Wheels is a bus service that provides public transportation in the Tri-Valley Region (southeast Alameda County) of the San Francisco Bay Area, in the United States. Started in 1986, Wheels offers service to various communities in three cities, and connects to Bay Area Rapid Transit (BART) and Altamont Corridor Express (ACE) trains for connections to and from the greater Bay Area (Oakland, San Francisco, San Jose) and Central Valley (Stockton, Modesto, Tracy).

Wheels is operated by the Livermore Amador Valley Transit Authority (LAVTA), and it has carried nearly 2 million passengers annually.

Areas served 
Wheels operates in Alameda County, with limited service in Contra Costa County.

Alameda County:
 Dublin
Pleasanton
Livermore

Contra Costa County:
 Pleasant Hill
 San Ramon
 Walnut Creek

Fixed-route service 
As of March 2020, Wheels operates seven local routes, two Rapid routes, three express routes, fifteen select school trippers and three shuttle routes. Descriptions for all routes are described below.

Local routes 
Note that routes with an X are express routes. And routes with an R are Rapid routes

 Wheels also operated an All-Nighter route, Route 810, that ran between Downtown Livermore to Bay Fair BART Station in San Leandro, serving areas currently provided by the all-day Route 10. However, due to budget cuts and low ridership, this route was eliminated on June 27, 2009.

Tri-Valley Rapid 

On January 24, 2011, Wheels launched its first Bus Rapid Transit (BRT) service called the "Tri-Valley Rapid", dubbed route "R" for short. Billed as "the next generation transit system", the Tri-Valley Rapid makes travel in the Tri-Valley area (Dublin, Pleasanton, and Livermore) cleaner, easier, and faster. Route R was a route that ran parallel to its parent route-route 10 from Stoneridge Mall to the Lawrence Livermore National Laboratory from 6a.m. to 9p.m. As of August 2016, Wheels rolled out a second Rapid route numbered "30R" along with new and modified routes throughout the system. Route 10 was then modified and renumbered as route "10R". Wheels Rapid service incorporates similar features already used by local Bay Area transit agencies, like AC Transit and Golden Gate Transit, including:

 Buses operating every 15 minutes from 5:00a.m. to 7:00p.m. on weekdays. And 15 minutes all other times to provide maximum convenience for passengers
 Stops are mainly concentrated at major intersections and attractions along the route
 All-day service (operates from 4:30a.m. to 1:40a.m. on weekdays)
 New technology using bus only lanes with signal priority also known as "Queue Jump Signals" at certain intersections
 New low floor, ultra low emission hybrid buses with distinct styling and free on board Wi-Fi
 Enhanced bus shelters with electronic bus arrival signs (similar to the NextBus deployed on AC Transit and San Francisco MUNI)

Schedule and stops served by the Tri-Valley Rapid (redirects to wheelsbus.com)

Express routes 
All express routes operate weekday peak periods only (between 5:00 and 9:00am and 3:30 and 8:00pm). Holiday service is not currently provided by express routes.

Shuttle routes 
Wheels shuttle routes are numbered between 50 and 59, and usually operate on certain days or at certain times only. These routes serve destinations close to BART, local events, office and industrial parks, and ACE stations.
Holiday service is currently provided by routes 53 and 54 on Martin Luther King Jr.'s day and President's day.

School-day services 
Wheels operates fifteen dedicated Select School routes (also known as School Trippers) that bring students to and from schools in the cities of Dublin and Pleasanton. These routes only operate when schools are in session.

Regular routes that provide school-day services: These routes provide additional trips to serve nearby schools along their main routes.
 2 (East Dublin) Fallon Middle School
 14 (Pleasanton-Livermore) Livermore High School, Hart Middle School
 10R (Pleasanton-Livermore) Amador Valley High School, Granada High School
 30R (Dublin-Livermore) Livermore High School, East Ave. Middle School

School-day-only services:
These trips are identified as routes numbered:
 Dublin schools: 500 series routes
 Pleasanton schools: 600 series routes

These operate during school days only, with most morning trips leaving later on Wednesdays in Dublin, and trips leaving later on Wednesdays and Thursdays in Pleasanton.

Transfer hubs 
The major transfer points for Wheels routes include:
 Dublin/Pleasanton BART Station routes: 1, 2, 3, 8, 14, 10R, 20X, 30R, 54, 70X, 580X.
 Also the main transfer point for Amtrak Motorway, County Connection, San Joaquin RTD, and Stanislaus Regional Transit Authority (StanRTA).
 West Dublin/Pleasanton BART Station routes: 3, 30R, 53.
 Livermore Transit Center in Downtown Livermore routes: 10R, 11, 14, 15, 20X, 30R, 580X.
 Also the main transfer point for ACE commuter trains and Amtrak Motorway.

Ticketing

Fares 
Fares are effective 1 January 2019 

Children under 6 ride free and must be with an adult
Appropriate identification must be presented to obtain the discounted Senior/Disabled fare.

Transfers 
Transfers are given out to passengers only at time of boarding if Clipper Card is used, are honored only on the day issued, and are valid on any Wheels or Rapid fixed route bus within two hours after boarding.

 Local Wheels route to another Wheels route: Free with transfer using Clipper Card
 County Connection: Free with transfer using Clipper Card
 ACE: Free with a valid and visible ACE train ticket
 BART to Bus: $1 discount with a white BART to Bus ticket upon exiting the BART Station (you can't use a regular BART ticket)
 Bus to BART: $2.00 (you can't use a regular BART ticket)

Passes 
Wheels offers for sale several bus passes or punch cards which provide a discount over cash fare:
 Monthly Pass (East Bay Value Pass) for US$60.00, valid on all Wheels, County Connection, Tri Delta Transit and WestCAT fixed-route buses
 Senior (65+)/Disabled Monthly Pass for US$18.00

All-Time roster

References

External links 
Livermore Amador Valley Transit Authority official website
List of Wheels bus routes and descriptions

Bus transportation in California
Public transportation in Alameda County, California